Dominykas Galkevičius (born 16 October 1986, in Jonava) is a Lithuanian retired football midfielder and current head coach of Kauno Žalgiris' B-team.

Career

Club
In November 2010, he came on trial to Serbian side Red Star Belgrade. In 2011, he joined Zagłębie Lubin on two and a half year contract. In January 2013 Galkevičius joined the Latvian Higher League club Daugava Rīga. He left the club in September 2013, joining the Belarusian Premier League club Naftan Novopolotsk.

2017 and 2018 was in FC Stumbras.

In December 2018 became member of FK Kauno Žalgiris.

International
On 25 May 2010 he made his international debut against Ukraine in Kharkiv.

Coaching career
He decided to retire at the end of 2019 and was hired as head coach for FK Kauno Žalgiris' B-team.

References

External links
 
 
 

1986 births
Living people
Lithuanian footballers
Lithuania international footballers
Association football midfielders
Lithuanian expatriate footballers
Expatriate footballers in Poland
Lithuanian expatriate sportspeople in Poland
Expatriate footballers in Belarus
Lithuanian expatriate sportspeople in Belarus
Expatriate footballers in Latvia
Lithuanian expatriate sportspeople in Latvia
A Lyga players
Ekstraklasa players
Belarusian Premier League players
Latvian Higher League players
FK Jonava players
FK Ekranas players
Zagłębie Lubin players
FC Belshina Bobruisk players
FK Daugava (2003) players
FC Naftan Novopolotsk players
FK Klaipėdos Granitas players
FK Atlantas players
FK Sūduva Marijampolė players
Lithuanian football managers